Humble Parish is a parish in the Diocese of Funen in Langeland Municipality, Denmark. Until 2007, the parish was in the Sydlangeland Municipality (Funen County), and until 1970 was in Svendborg County. The parish contains the towns of Humble and Ristinge. The parish has an enclave around Skovsgård, between Lindelse Parish and Fodslette Parish.

References

External links 
 Fil med information om sogne og kommuner
 Autoriserede stednavne i Danmark

Langeland Municipality
Parishes of Denmark